is a Japanese leisure and tourism subsidiary of the Keisei Electric Railway Company, headquartered in Urayasu, Chiba, Japan where it also owns and operates the Tokyo Disney Resort. The company operates in three segments, divided as theme parks, hotels, and other business. It is a component of the TOPIX Large70 index.

Oriental Land pays licenses and royalties to The Walt Disney Company for use of their intellectual properties, while Disney provides consultation and their Imagineering division to design and build Oriental Land's theme parks and attractions at the resort. The Oriental Land Company is the only Disney Resort business company in the world that has no capital relationship with Disney.

History
The Oriental Land Company was founded in 1960. The company was developing Maihama, an area of land in Urayasu that was created through land reclamation. Two years later, the company contacted Disney about building a theme park. OLC was also building a few shopping centers in Chiba Prefecture.

In 1979, Oriental and Disney agreed to build the theme park. The company borrowed $1.4 billion for Disneyland which they paid off in three years.

Disney announced in  the building of Tokyo DisneySea to be owned by Oriental next to the Tokyo Disneyland. In , the company sold two sets of bonds, $200 million in quake bonds and $406 million of bonds to fund DisneySea.

In 2000, OLC formed Ikspiari Co., Ltd. to run Ikspiari.

Even though the Disney Stores maintained strong sales, mounting cost of sales and operation and the loss of key executives who had driven the Disney Stores to success led The Walt Disney Company to convert the Disney Stores into a licensed operation. The Japanese stores were sold to the company in April 2002 and placed into Retail Networks Co., Ltd. subsidiary.

In October 2008, Oriental Land Company announced that it and Disney had shelved plans for a new Disney complex in a major Japanese city. The company and Disney had spent more than a year studying an urban-style amusement facility for 2010 or later, but ended planning due to low profits expected versus the investment. The firm said it would continue to explore possibilities for a new business, which might not involve Disney.

The Oriental Land Company announced an agreement that it would sell Retail Networks Co., Ltd., its Japanese Disney Stores, back to The Walt Disney Company. Disney took over beginning on March 31, 2010, Retail Networks Co., Ltd., Oriental Land Company subsidiary owning the Disney Stores in Japan. OLC's hotel subsidiary, Milial Resort Hotels Co., Ltd. purchased on  the Brighton Corporation, another hotel company.

On , Create Restaurants Holdings Inc. fully acquired RC Japan Co., Ltd. from Oriental Land Co., Ltd. for 65 million yen.

License 
Oriental Land Co., Ltd does not have a license for Marvel Entertainment. There are no facilities related to Marvel in Tokyo Disneyland and Tokyo DisneySea.

Corporate assets
 Tokyo Disney Resort, Theme Park segment
 Tokyo Disneyland
 Tokyo DisneySea
Milial Resort Hotels Co., Ltd., Hotel Business segment
 Disney's Ambassador Hotel
 Tokyo DisneySea Hotel MiraCosta
 Tokyo Disneyland Hotel
Brighton Corporation, Ltd.
Palm & Fountain Terrance Hotel
Urayasu Brighton Hotel
Kyoto Brighton Hotel
Other Business segment
IKSPIARI Co., Ltd., operates Ikspiari, an entertainment complex near the theme parks that has 9 themed zones with more than 100 shops and a 16-screen cinema.
employee cafeterias; and theme restaurants
Maihama Resort Line Co., Ltd. operates Disney Resort Line, a monorail service
affiliate transportation companies under shared ownership with Keisei Electric Railway Co., Ltd.
Tokyo Bay City Kotsu Co., Ltd. (35%)
Maihama Resort Cab Co., Ltd. (43%)
Keisei Transit Bus Co., Ltd. (33%)

References

External links
OLC Group website (In Japanese)
OLC Group website (In English)

Companies listed on the Tokyo Stock Exchange
Companies based in Chiba Prefecture
Entertainment companies established in 1960
Mitsui Fudosan
Keisei Electric Railway
Japanese companies established in 1960